Leptomithrax is a genus of crabs in the family Majidae, first described by Edward J. Miers in 1876. They have been on Earth for 37.2 million years.

Species

Extant species 

 Leptomithrax australis (Jacquinot in Jacquinot & Lucas, 1853)
 Leptomithrax bifidus (Ortmann, 1893)
 Leptomithrax depressus Richer de Forges, 1993
 Leptomithrax edwardsii (De Haan, 1835)
 Leptomithrax eldredgei Richer de Forges & Ng, 2015
 Leptomithrax gaimardii (H. Milne Edwards, 1834)
 Leptomithrax garricki Griffin, 1966
 Leptomithrax globifer Rathbun, 1918
 Leptomithrax longimanus (Miers, 1876)
 Leptomithrax longipes (G. M. Thomson, 1902)
 Leptomithrax mortenseni Bennett, 1964
 Leptomithrax sinensis Rathbun, 1916
 Leptomithrax sternocostulatus (H. Milne Edwards, 1851)
 Leptomithrax tuberculatus Whitelegge, 1900
 Leptomithrax waitei (Whitelegge, 1900)

Extinct species 

 Leptomithrax atavus Glaessner 1960
 Leptomithrax elegans Jenkins 1985
 Leptomithrax elongatus McLay 1995
 Leptomithrax garthi McLay et al. 1995
 Leptomithrax griffini Feldmann and Maxwell 1990
 Leptomithrax irirangi Glaessner 1960
 Leptomithrax martensis Jenkins 1985
 Leptomithrax uruti Glaessner 1960

References 

Majoidea
Crustacean genera
Taxa described in 1876
Taxa named by Edward J. Miers